In mathematics, a superpartient ratio, also called  superpartient number or epimeric ratio, is a rational number that is greater than one and is not superparticular. The term has fallen out of use in modern pure mathematics, but continues to be used in music theory and in the historical study of mathematics.

Superpartient ratios were written about by Nicomachus in his treatise Introduction to Arithmetic.

Overview
Mathematically, a superpartient number is a ratio of the form

where a is greater than 1 (a > 1) but not < n and is also coprime to (shares no prime factor, like two primes - shares no other factors either - with) n. Ratios of the form  are also greater than one and fully reduced, but are called superparticular ratios and are not superpartient.

Etymology
"Superpartient" comes from Greek ἐπιμερής epimeres "containing a whole and a fraction," literally "superpartient".

See also
 Mathematics of musical scales

Further reading
Partch, Harry (1979). Genesis of a Music, p.68. .

Rational numbers
Intervals (music)